Andreas Ioannis "Andrew" Oikonomou was a Greek track and field athlete who competed in the 1904 Summer Olympics in the marathon. He finished last of the fifteen finishers, but moved up to fourteenth after Frederick Lorz was disqualified.

See also 
 Greece at the 1904 Summer Olympics

References

External links 
 

Greek male marathon runners
Olympic athletes of Greece
Athletes (track and field) at the 1904 Summer Olympics
Year of birth missing
Year of death missing
20th-century Greek people